Music for Films is the seventh solo studio album by British musician Brian Eno, released in 1978 and following his ambient album Ambient 1: Music for Airports. It is a conceptual work intended as a soundtrack for imaginary films, although many of the pieces had already appeared in actual films.

Content 

The album is a loose compilation of material from the period 1975 to 1978, composed of short tracks ranging from one-and-a-half minutes to just over four, making it the antithesis of the long, sprawling, ambient pieces he later became known for. The compositional styles and equipment used also carried over onto Eno's work on some of David Bowie's 1977 album Low.

Unlike Eno's later ambient works, Music for Films utilises a broader sonic palette, with Eno's synthesizers and "found sounds" being supplemented by standard studio instrumentation played by other musicians (see Credits).

Release 

Originally released as a limited-edition (five hundred copies) LP in 1976 which was sent to a selection of filmmakers for possible inclusion in their work, the commercial Music for Films release was expanded to include a number of pieces for, as Eno put it, "possible use as soundtracks to 'imaginary' films". In fact, excerpts from the album did appear in at least seven films and one TV series: 

Three further Film albums were released: Music for Films Volume 2 in 1983 (originally only available as a part of the ten-LP box set Working Backwards: 1983-1973), Music for Films III in 1988 (which consisted of work by various artists), and More Music for Films in 2005, which combined tracks from the box set LP along with tracks from the original 1976 limited edition release.

Different versions 

The album has manifested in several forms, featuring different track-listings and track-times.

1 : Promotional LP, 1976 (the Director's Edition), issued in a limited number of 500 copies. There are two versions:
A test pressing with 25 tracks (where the titles are not given).
Official release with 27 tracks. Many of those tracks were taken from Another Green World or appeared later on the official 1978 issue. Essentially all of the 'unreleased' tracks are available on the Music for Fans, Vol. 1 bootleg and – rather more officially – on the Eno Instrumental Box Set.
2 : Original 1978 release. The LP packaging featured a matte finish on the outside with a glossy finish on the inside, opposite of standard LP covers at the time.
3 : Editions EG reissue. The tracks were rearranged into what Eno felt was a more satisfactory sequence. This is now the "standard" issue. (Note: the cassette version of the Editions EG reissue used the track order from the original 1978 version, though the packaging listed the tracks in the rearranged order.)

"Deep Waters" appears in More Music for Films as "Dark Waters".
"Dark Waters" is unpublished elsewhere.

Track listing 

Standard edition (1978)

 Limited-edition 1976 promo issue

"Becalmed"
"Deep Waters"
"'There Is Nobody'"
"Spain"
"Untitled"
"The Last Door"
"Chemin de Fer"
"Dark Waters"
"Sparrowfall (1)"
"Sparrowfall (2)"
"Sparrowfall (3)"
"Evening Star"
"Another Green World"
"In Dark Trees"
"Fuseli"
"Melancholy Waltz"
"Northern Lights"
"From the Coast"
"Shell"
"Little Fishes"
"Empty Landscape"
"Reactor"
"The Secret"
"Don't Look Back"
"Marseilles"
"Final Sunset"
"Juliet"

 Editions EG reissue

"Aragon" – 1:37
Performed by: Eno, Percy Jones, Phil Collins, Paul Rudolph
"From the Same Hill"  – 3:00
"Inland Sea"  – 1:24
"Two Rapid Formations" – 3:23
Performed by: Eno, Bill MacCormick, Dave Mattacks, Fred Frith
"Slow Water" – 3:16
Performed by: Eno, Robert Fripp
"Sparrowfall (1)"  – 1:10
"Sparrowfall (2)"  – 1:43
"Sparrowfall (3)"  – 1:23
"Alternative 3"  – 3:15
"Quartz"  – 2:02
"Events in Dense Fog"  – 3:43
"There Is Nobody"  – 1:43
"Patrolling Wire Borders" (Eno, Percy Jones) – 1:42
Performed by: Eno, Paul Rudolph, Phil Collins, John Cale, Rod Melvin
"A Measured Room"  – 1:05
Performed by: Eno, Percy Jones
"Task Force"  – 1:22
"M386"  – 2:50
Performed by: Eno, Percy Jones, Phil Collins, Paul Rudolph
"Strange Light" (Eno, Fred Frith) – 2:09
Performed by: Eno, Fred Frith, Rhett Davies
"Final Sunset"  – 4:13

Personnel 
Rhett Davies – trumpet on "Strange Light", assistant producer
John Cale – viola on "Patrolling Wire Borders"
Rod Melvin – electric piano on "Patrolling Wire Borders"
Paul Rudolph – guitar on "Aragon", "Patrolling Wire Borders" and "M386"
Phil Collins – percussion on "Aragon", "Patrolling Wire Borders" and "M386"
Percy Jones – bass guitar on "Aragon", "A Measured Room" and "M386"
Robert Fripp – electric guitar on "Slow Water"
Fred Frith – electric guitar on "Two Rapid Formations" and "Strange Light"
Bill MacCormick – bass guitar on "Two Rapid Formations"
Dave Mattacks – percussion on "Two Rapid Formations"
Ritva Saarikko – cover photograph

Versions

Chart performance

See also 
Original Soundtracks 1 – a collaboration with U2 that also makes soundtrack music for non-existent films.

References 

Works cited

External links 

 

Brian Eno albums
1978 albums
Albums produced by Brian Eno
E.G. Records albums